Melicertum is a genus of hydrozoans belonging to the family Melicertidae.

The species of this genus are found in Europe and Northern America.

Species:

Melicertum campanula 
Melicertum octocostatum 
Melicertum ovalis

References

Melicertidae
Hydrozoan genera